Achacho is a 2007 Indian Tamil language romantic drama film written and directed by V. S. Balray. The film stars newcomers Sri Hari and Varshini, with Shanmugasundaram, Thalaivasal Vijay, Lavanya, Kumarimuthu, Nambirajan and Ponmaran playing supporting roles. It was released on 4 May 2007.

Plot

The film begins with doctor Dhayalan being interviewed by the press: he explains that the baby girls should be saved from infanticide in India and explains how there will be a lesser number of women in the years to come.

In a remote village, the village chief Nattamai organises a competition to decide who will marry the single woman. There are now twenty-four unmarried young men waiting to get married and seven girls who have not yet come of age in the village. The young men may not marry women from other villages due to their customs, so they have to wait until their village girl attains puberty and the competition will decide it. At the village pachayat, Nattamai finds that the fourteen-year-old girl Vennila who is from their village is living in the city. He then orders that Vennila will marry one of the villagers in four years.

Four years later, Vennila comes to the village and the twenty-four men try to woo her. Later, Kumaran, son of a rich jeweller, comes to the village to give Vennila the jewels her father ordered and he accidentally kisses her. After multiple encounters, they eventually fall in love with each other. In the meantime, one of the young men eloped with a girl from another village, when the Nattamai learns about it, he abducts them and burns them alive in public.

In the past, an astrologer told the ruthless village chief Muthulingam that a baby girl will destroy the village in the future so Muthulingam killed all the baby girl, the years passed, and there were no girls in the village. After Muthulingam's death, the new village chief stopped this inhuman activity.

Tired of this impractical custom, Nattamai and the villagers let Kumaran and Vennila live together. The young men are now allowed to get marry girls from other villages.

Cast

Sri Hari as Kumaran
Varshini as Vennila
Shanmugasundaram as Nattamai
Thalaivasal Vijay as Periyasamy
Lavanya as Devi
Kumarimuthu as Kumarimuthu
Nambirajan as Muthulingam
Ponmaran as Samikkanu, Vennila's father
Muthukaalai as Tea master
Benjamin as Ice cream seller
Boys Rajan as Dhayalan
Sahadevan
Mahadevan
Sendrayan as a young man
Suja Varunee in a special appearance
Seema in a special appearance

Production
V. S. Balray made his directorial debut with Achacho under the banner of Rosy Pictures. Newcomer Sri Hari was chosen to play the hero while newcomer Varshini (credited as Priyasri) was selected to play the heroine. Twenty-four newcomers were cast to play young bachelors. M. K. S. Narula Khan composed the music, C. T. Arul Selvan took care of camera work and Suresh Urs was the film editor. The film was entirely shot in Gobichettipalayam.

Soundtrack
The music composed by M. K. S. Narula Khan, with lyrics written by V. S. Balray. IndiaGlitz said, "With a healthy mix of soft, peppy and earthy songs, Noorulah has shown he is a good prospect for the future [..] Noorulah Khan has made a right beginning".

Reception
Indiareel wrote, "Though Achacho has got a good theme, logical potholes in the film makes it hard to survive in the second half". Cinesouth said, "Such a happening in the present age is unbelievable, but hats off to the director for having managed 24 new faces and moving the story along into a comic angle". Malini Mannath wrote for Chennai Online, "It's a plot that's different from the routine ones. Debutant Balraj can be commended for his novelty of concept and his effort to think differently. But what the film misses out on strongly is finesse".

References

External links 
 

2000s Tamil-language films
2007 directorial debut films
2007 films
2007 romantic drama films
Indian romantic drama films